Yoruba demon is a slang for a young man, typically of Yoruba descent who is usually the gifted, smartest and prolific individual in all ramifications of life. The words Yoruba Demon started as a joke on social media platform in 2015, but has also been used as an ethnic slur or insult.

Yoruba demons are typically associated with wedding parties (Owambe); they are usually the groom's men or friends of the groom. They are typically dressed in Yoruba native attire such as Agbada, buba, sokoto and fila (cap). Yoruba demons are stereotypically always neat and smartly dressed. 

Attributes or characteristics associated with Yoruba demons include: slick tongue, fashionable dressing, flirting and lying, being surrounded by beautiful women, sociable, and articulate accents.

References

Yoruba words and phrases
Yoruba culture
Slang terms for men